B-Ball's Best Kept Secret is a compilation album released by Epic Records that featured NBA players performing songs with hip hop artists including Shaquille O'Neal.

Track listing
"Hip Hop Basketball Genie"- :48
"Check It"- 4:07 (Dana Barros)
"Lost in the Sauce"- 4:57 (Malik Sealy)
"Mic Check 1-2"- 3:45 (Shaquille O'Neal and Ill Al Skratch)
"Earl the Goat"- :34
"Flow On"- 4:03 (Cedric Ceballos and Warren G)
"Anything Can Happen"- 5:03 (Brian Shaw)
"Sumptin' to Groove To"- 3:21 (Chris Mills)
"From the Bay to L.A."- 1:14 (Sway & King Tech)
"What the Kidd Didd"- 3:52 (Jason Kidd and Money-B)
"Funk in the Trunk"- 4:17 (J.R. Rider)
"Phat Swoosh"- :55
"All Night Party"- 3:47 (Dennis Scott)
"Livin' Legal and Large"- 3:54 (Gary Payton)
"D.J. S and S Represents"- 1:18
"Ya Don't Stop"- 4:42 (Dana Barros, Cedric Ceballos, Grand Puba, Sadat X, AG and Diamond D)

References

Hip hop compilation albums
1994 compilation albums
Epic Records compilation albums
Albums produced by Warren G
Albums produced by Diamond D